The Big Problem ≠ The Solution. The Solution = Let It Be (aka The Big Problem Does Not Equal the Solution, The Solution Equals Let It Be) is an album by Crispin Glover which was recorded by Barnes and Barnes. The liner notes state that if you discover what "The Big Problem" is, then you can call (213) 464-5053 to tell Glover what you think it is. As of June 2007, the phone number has been disconnected.

Track listing 
 "Overture" – 0:36
 "Selected Readings from Rat Catching" – 3:52
 "The New Clean Song" – 2:17
 "Auto-Manipulator" – 4:01
 "Clowny Clown Clown" – 2:55
 "Getting Out of Bed" – 2:37
 "These Boots Are Made for Walking" – 4:04
 "The Daring Young Man on the Flying Trapeze" – 3:37
 "Never Say 'Never' to Always" – 0:57
 "Selected Readings from Oak Mot Part I" – 6:03
 "Selected Readings from Oak Mot Part II" – 2:04
 "Selected Readings from Oak Mot Part III" – 3:24
 "Selected Readings from Oak Mot Part IV" – 0:25
 Untitled – 2:11
 Untitled – 2:30
 Untitled – 1:14

Promotion 
A music video was made for "Clowny Clown Clown" and was directed by Glover. A portion of the video was shown during Glover's March 28, 1990 interview on The Late Show with David Letterman, during which the album was more generally discussed.

References

1989 albums
Crispin Glover albums
Restless Records albums